Ramblin' Rod Anders (November 26, 1932 – May 11, 2002), born Rodney Carl Andersen, was an American television presenter and the host of The Ramblin' Rod Show, a morning children's television program in Oregon, from 1964 until his retirement on August 8, 1997. The KPTV host was well known locally for his iconic, button-covered sweater which he wore on air. He was rumored to have been the inspiration for Krusty the Clown, a character on the long-running animated sitcom The Simpsons, but this was eventually refuted.

Biography
Anders grew up in Multnomah County, Oregon and was born at St. Vincent's Hospital. He began his career in radio broadcasting in the 1950s, singing and playing music on Saturday mornings for Tillamook radio station KTIL. He stayed with KTIL until he was drafted into the armed forces, where he served as a radio repairman. When his tenure was up, he returned to radio, filling on-air positions beginning in 1958 at KFLW in Klamath Falls, Oregon and continuing to KXL and KPOJ.

While working for KPOJ, Anders heard of an opening for a host on a local children's show called Popeye's Pier 12 on KPTV. He replaced host Bob Adkins (better known as "Addie Bobkins"). In the early 1970s, the show was renamed The Ramblin' Rod Show.

By the late 1970s, Anders had begun to wear message buttons on his cardigan, all of which were given to him by fans. Within a few years, his cardigan was almost completely covered. At one point, the host estimated that he had received 10,000 to 15,000 buttons.

Each year, Anders helped anchor local KPTV coverage of the Jerry Lewis MDA Telethon and the Easter Seals Telethon. He served as a moderator on a Saturday morning public affairs show called 12 in the Morning and appeared in many advertisements for Mike Salta Pontiac and Beaverton Toyota, two local automobile dealerships. Anders also served as one of KPTV's in-house studio announcers for many years. Anders retired from KPTV in August 1997.

In 1994, Anders constructed the Apple Valley Airport on land near his log cabin home in Buxton, Oregon, west of Portland. During his retirement, he enjoyed flying and spending time with his family. Anders died in May, 2002 after succumbing to a stroke suffered while making a personal appearance at a Portland Volunteers of America Thrift Store located at 181st and Division streets, now defunct.

Show
According to an article that appeared in the Eugene Register-Guard, the premise of The Ramblin' Rod Show was that children "love slapstick comedy... and kids love to see themselves on television, which is why Anders insisted on the individual shots of each child." The show was very popular, with a 20-25% share in its time slot and an audience that was often booked a month in advance.

The show originally highlighted Popeye, cartoons, but later showed Hanna-Barbera, and Warner Bros. cartoons and also hosted a smile contest featuring members of the audience as contestants. Anders began each show by arriving on the set in a mobile tug-boat prop. The series, originally entitled Popeye's Pier 12, had several marine-themed characters but they were phased out over time, replaced with Chuck E. Cheese and his Pizzatime Players, who would come out and do a song and dance number with the audience, usually to slightly altered Americana songs, such as Dancing in the Street.

The format of The Ramblin' Rod Show remained simple throughout Anders' tenure. The host introduced each guest, spoke with them, celebrated birthdays, played cartoons, and hosted smile contests. In the early years, Anders played guitar and had a skunk puppet named Petunia, which was phased out in later years.

In the 1970s and '80s, Smile contest winners and children celebrating their birthdays were entitled to complimentary Homer Pies, Archway brand cookies and Pop Shoppe soda pop.

Cartoon Character Segments

Krusty the Clown inspiration
A decades-old rumor claims that Ramblin' Rod inspired Matt Groening to create the character Krusty the Clown, the bitter host of a fictional children's program on The Simpsons. Groening, who grew up in Portland, was likely aware of Anders' show on KPTV. However, in interviews, Groening has mentioned that it was Ramblin' Rod's predecessor on KPTV, a somewhat melancholy clown named Rusty Nails, who was the creation of Jim Allen and served as a partial inspiration for the character of Krusty.

Trivia
In autumn of 2011, the Fizz Soda and Candy Shop, located in Portland, created, and are still adding to, a shrine to Ramblin' Rod.
KPTV donated his microphone and an original Ramblin' Rod button to the shrine.

See also
 List of local children's television series (United States)

References

External links
 Archive of Yesterdays KPTV Ramblin Rod/Popeyes Pier 12 page, selected screenshot collection
 Rod's final show and goodbye
 

American children's television presenters
1932 births
2002 deaths
Television personalities from Portland, Oregon
Entertainers from Oregon
Local children's television programming in the United States